Telkom may refer to:

Telkom Indonesia
Telkom Kenya
Telkom (South Africa)
Telkom Media, a pay-TV company subsidiary

See also
Telcom (disambiguation)
Telecom (disambiguation)
Telekom (disambiguation)
List of telephone operating companies